Sunday is a day of the week.

Sunday may also refer to:

Film and television
 Sunday (1915 film), an American silent film directed by George W. Lederer
 Sunday (1969 film), a Yugoslav film by Lordan Zafranović
 Sunday (1997 film), an indie film by Jonathan Nossiter
 Sunday (2002 film), a TV film about the 1972 "Bloody Sunday" shootings in Derry, Northern Ireland
 Sunday (2008 film), a Bollywood film
 Sunday (2011 film) or Dimanche, a Canadian animated short by Patrick Doyon
 Sunday (Australian TV program), a 1981-2008 news and current affairs programme
 Sunday (New Zealand TV programme), a current affairs programme
 "Sunday" (Desperate Housewives), an episode of Desperate Housewives
 "Sunday" (Stargate Atlantis), an episode of Stargate Atlantis

Music
 The Sundays, a British rock band
 Sunday (opera), an opera by Karlheinz Stockhausen
 Sunday (singer) (born 1987), South Korean pop singer

Songs
 "Sunday" (jazz standard), written by Chester Conn and Benny Krueger
 "Sunday" (The Cranberries song)
 "Sunday" (Hurts song)
 "Sunday" (Jessica Mauboy song)
 "Sunday" (Lo-Pro song)
 "Sunday" (Schiller song)
 "Sunday" (Sonic Youth song)
 "Sunday (The Day Before My Birthday)", by Moby
 "Sunday", by Bloc Party from A Weekend in the City
 "Sunday", by David Bowie from Heathen
 "Sunday", by The Lemonheads from Creator
 "Sunday", by Sia from Colour the Small One
 "Sunday", by The View from Bread and Circuses

Other uses
 Sunday (name)
 Sunday (computer virus)
 The Sunday, Las Vegas magazine
 Sunday (magazine), flagship publication of the Lord's Day Association 
 Sunday (radio programme), a UK religious affairs programme
 Sunday Communications, a parent company of SUNDAY, a mobile communication operator in Hong Kong

See also

 Sundae, an ice cream dessert
 The Sun Days, Swedish pop band
 Sun Day, U.S. solar power advocacy day
 Day of the Sun, North Korean public holiday
 Bloody Sunday (disambiguation) 
 Sunday Bloody Sunday (disambiguation) 
 Sunday Morning (disambiguation) 
 Sunday Edition (disambiguation)